The Timpanogos Cooperative Marketing Association Building, also known as Snow Station and as Orem Railroad Depot and Packing Sheds, is located at 380 S. Orem Blvd. in Orem, Utah.  It was built in 1926 and includes Prairie School architecture.

It was listed on the National Register of Historic Places in 2008.

The Salt Lake and Utah Railroad, an electric railroad from Salt Lake to Provo, known as the "Orem Line", opened in 1913, and was important in the economic development of Orem.

References

Railway stations on the National Register of Historic Places in Utah
Prairie School architecture in Utah
Commercial buildings completed in 1926
Commercial buildings on the National Register of Historic Places in Utah
Former railway stations in Utah County, Utah
National Register of Historic Places in Orem, Utah